Zarečje is a village west of Ilirska Bistrica in the Inner Carniola region of Slovenia.

Mass graves
Zarečje is the site of three known mass graves or unmarked graves from the end of the Second World War. They all contain the remains of German soldiers from the 97th Corps that fell at the beginning of May 1945. It contains the remains of 16 soldiers. It contains the remains of one soldier.

Church
The local church in the settlement is dedicated to Saint Sebastian and belongs to the Parish of Ilirska Bistrica.

References

External links
Zarečje on Geopedia

Populated places in the Municipality of Ilirska Bistrica